Solar America Cities is a U.S. Department of Energy (U.S. DOE) initiative to promote solar energy at the local level through city programs.

History
The DOE has named 25 U.S. cities as a Solar America City which are promoting solar technology adoption at the local level.

These cities will take a comprehensive, citywide approach to solar technology that facilitates its mainstream acceptance. Solar technologies promoted by Solar America Cities include photovoltaics and concentrating solar power (which both produce solar electricity) as well as solar water and air heating.

They represent 16 different states and have varying degrees of solar resources and experience with solar technologies. The cities were not selected for their number of sunny days. Rather, DOE selected these urban communities based on their long-term commitment to developing solar energy markets in their municipalities. Some have extensive experience with solar power and some are just getting started. Different cities are also taking different approaches to building a sustainable solar infrastructure. DOE expects that these cities’ creative efforts will serve as models for other urban communities in the future.

List
The 25 cities selected are: 
Ann Arbor, Michigan
Austin, TX
Berkeley, CA
Boston, MA
Denver, CO
Houston, TX
Knoxville, TN
Madison, WI
Milwaukee, WI
Minneapolis – St. Paul, MN
New Orleans, LA
New York City, NY
Orlando, FL
Philadelphia, PA
Pittsburgh, PA
Portland, OR
Sacramento, CA
Salt Lake City, UT
San Antonio, TX
San Diego, CA
San Francisco, CA
San Jose, CA
Santa Rosa, CA
Seattle, WA
Tucson, AZ

Initiative
The desired outcomes of the Solar America Cities are: 
 Development of a comprehensive citywide approach that lays the foundation for a viable solar market that includes key stakeholders such as municipal, county, and state agencies, non-profit organizations, and utilities, as well as private partners such as developers and solar companies 
 Integration of solar energy technologies into city energy and climate planning 
 Increased installation of solar energy technologies on city facilities 
 Removal of market barriers to solar energy development that exist in urban planning charters, zoning regulations, building codes, permitting, and inspections 
 Creation of city-level solar incentives (e.g., solar rebates, financial assistance, tax credits, property tax abatements, and tax incentives to solar manufacturers that are located in the city) 
 Increased public awareness of solar energy among residents and local businesses, achieved through outreach, curriculum development, incentive programs, and other innovative approaches 
 A widespread increase in the adoption of solar energy technologies across the city—in the residential, commercial, and public building sectors, and at the utility 
 Lessons learned that are of value to other communities, cities, and counties looking to increase their use of solar energy technologies.

The Solar America Cities program has engaged over 180 organizations, including municipal, county, and state agencies, solar companies, universities, utilities, and non-profit organizations. These partners have made a commitment to power their cities with clean, safe, reliable energy—solar energy.

The Solar America Cities program has received a total of $4.9 million in federal financial assistance.

See also

Solar Cities in Australia

References

Energy in the United States
Renewable energy in the United States
Solar power in the United States